The 10th Engineer Battalion is a unit of the United States Army that deploys to designated contingency areas and conducts combat and/or stability operations in support of a brigade combat team. It is a divisional mechanized combat engineer unit, composed of four line companies and a headquarters company.  As of 17 January 2015, the battalion exists as the 10th Brigade Engineer Battalion (10th BEB) at Fort Stewart, GA under the 1st Armored Brigade Combat Team, 3rd Infantry Division.

Unit insignia

History

Lineage 
Organized 31 December 1861 in the Regular Army at Washington, D.C., from new and existing companies of engineers as a provisional engineer battalion (constituted 28 July 1866 as the Battalion of Engineers)

 Expanded 14 March – 7 June 1901 to form the 1st and 2nd Battalions of Engineers (2nd Battalion of Engineers—hereafter separate lineage)
 1st Battalion of Engineers expanded, reorganized, and redesignated 1 July 1916 as the 1st Regiment of Engineers
 1st Regiment of Engineers expanded 15 May 1917 to form the 1st, 6th, and the 7th Regiments of Engineers (1st and 7th Regiments—hereafter separate lineages)
 6th Regiment of Engineers redesignated 29 August 1917 as the 6th Engineers
 Assigned 1 October 1917 to the 3rd Division
 Regiment broken up 12 October 1939 and its elements reorganized and redesignated as follows:
 2nd Battalion as the 10th Engineer Battalion, an element of the 3rd Division (later redesignated as the 3rd Infantry Division);
 Headquarters and Headquarters and Service Company disbanded; and
 1st Battalion as the 6th Engineer Battalion—hereafter separate lineage
 10th Engineer Battalion redesignated 1 August 1942 as the 10th Engineer Combat Battalion
 Redesignated 1 March 1954 as the 10th Engineer Battalion
 Assigned 15 February 1996 to the 3rd Infantry Division
 Inactivated 15 March 2004 at Fort Stewart, Georgia, and relieved from assignment to the 3rd Infantry Division
 Assigned 17 January 2015 to the 1st Brigade Combat Team, 3rd Infantry Division, and activated at Fort Stewart, Georgia

Honors

Campaign participation credit 

 Civil War
 Peninsula
 Antietam
 Fredericksburg
 Wilderness
 Spotsylvania
 Cold Harbor
 Petersburg
 Appomattox
 Virginia 1863
 World War I
 Somme Defensive
 Champagne-Marne
 Aisne-Marne
 St. Mihiel
 Meuse-Argonne
 Champagne 1918
 World War II
 Algeria-French Morocco
 Tunisia
 Sicily (with arrowhead)
 Naples-Foggia
 Anzio (with arrowhead)
 Rome-Arno
 Southern France (with arrowhead)
 Rhineland
 Ardennes-Alsace
 Central Europe
 Korean War
 CCF Intervention
 First UN Counteroffensive
 CCF Spring Offensive
 UN Summer-Fall Offensive
 Second Korean Winter
 Korea, Summer-Fall 1952
 Third Korean Winter
 Korea, Summer 1953
 Desert Shield/Desert Storm 1991
 War on Terrorism
 Campaigns to be determined

Decorations 

 Presidential Unit Citation (Army)
 Streamer embroidered COLMAR
 Streamer embroidered IRAQ 2003
 Meritorious Unit Commendation (Army)
 Streamer embroidered KOREA 1950–1951
 French Croix de Guerre with Palm (World War I)
 Streamer embroidered CHAMPAGNE-MARNE, AISNE-MARNE
 French Croix de Guerre with Palm (World War II)
 Streamer embroidered COLMAR
 French Croix de Guerre (World War II)
 Fourragere
 Republic of Korea Presidential Unit Citation
 Streamer embroidered UIJONGBU CORRIDOR
 Streamer embroidered IRON TRIANGLE
 Chryssoun Aristion Andrias (Bravery Gold Medal of Greece)
 Streamer embroidered KOREA

Fallen Soldiers (known)  
WORLD WAR II

CPT Stanley E. Larson

Sgt. Albert J. Warner

Sgt. Glenn W. Scott

Pfc. Dorvall J. Walter

Pfc. Donald J. Towslee

2Lt. William A. Thomas

T/5. Jack H. Taylor

Pfc. Rex F. Stokes

Cpl. Fred C. Standish

Sgt. Israel E. Selph

Pvt. Gustave Ruiz

Pvt. Ralph W. Quinnan

Pfc. Willy Pederssen

Pvt. Walter F. Massey

Pfc. Grant H. Martin

1Lt. Joseph N. Marcantonio

Pfc. Lawrence E. Le Duc

Pvt. George B. King

Pvt. Cullie B. Johnson

Pvt. Thomas J. Houlihan

Pvt. John M. Hodge

Sgt. James R. Graybeal

1Lt. Vernon H. Evans

Pvt. Robert A. Engle

Pfc. Robert H. Dobbins

Pfc. Edward J. De Stefano

Pvt. Leonard F. Cwynar

Pvt. Cyril J. Chevalier

Pvt. Richard Carlson

Sgt. Wyatt D. Bassett

Pvt. Ted Barabas

Sgt. Donald H. Tosh

Pfc. Rafael Ordonez

T/5. Albert J. Klein

Sgt. Kenneth A. Stoner

1Lt. Leroy F. Sasse

Cpl. Grover G. Shepherd

T/5. Leon J. Weems

T/5. Thomas J. Redmond

S/Sgt. James M Renfro

2Lt. Earl H. Ostmeyer

Pfc. Harold C. Krueger

2Lt. Leo W. French Jr. (C Co) 1944 (KIA) Anzio 

KOREA

PV2 John A. Aimer (D Co), 29 Nov 1950 (KIA)

SFC Ellis L. Aldridge (HSC), 4 Oct 1951 (KIA)

PFC Herbert Armbruster (D Co), 29 Nov 1950 (KIA)

PFC Claude E. Bachtell (C Co), 23 Mar 1951 (DOW)

PFC Walter J. Ball (B Co), 21 Nov 1950 (KIA)

PV2 Bernard A. Beemon, 28 Nov 1950 (KIA)

CPL Arthur L. Belt, 28 Nov 1950 (KIA)

MSG Leonard J. Best (D Co), 29 Nov 1950 (MIA)

SGT Donald Bombardier (D Co), 28 Nov 1950 (KIA)

CPL Charles E. Burba (D Co), 28 Nov 1950 (KIA)

1LT Robert W. Carney (C Co), 25 Feb 1951 (KIA)

PV2 Sammie L. Clifton (D Co), 26 Mar 1951 (DOW)

PFC Josue, Cortes-Boisjoli (C Co), 5 Jun 1951 (KIA)

CPL Thomas R. Davison (D Co), 31 Dec 1951 (DD)

1LT Max L. DeRossett (HSC), 4 Oct 1951 (KIA)

PV2 Charles Drengberg, 29 Nov 1950 (DOW)

CPL James D. Eroddy, 12 Sep 1952 (KIA)

PFC Robert W. Faris (A Co), 29 Nov 1950 (KIA)

SGT Noe Franco, 10 May 1953 (KIA)

PFC John S. Grover (D Co), 24 Mar 1951 (DOW)

PV2 Salvador M. Guzman, 13 Jun 1953 (KIA)

PFC James E. Hartley Jr. (D Co), 28 Nov 1950 (KIA)

CPL Sonnie L. Holmes (HSC), 4 Nov 1951 (KIA)

PV2 Daniel B. Jewell, 28 Nov 1950 (KIA)

PFC Daniel R. Lambert (HSC), 4 Oct 1951 (KIA)

SGT Homer M. McDaniel (D Co), 28 Nov 1950 (MIA)

CPL Harry T. McGonigle (B Co), 21 Nov 1950 (KIA)

CPL Larry O. Merrill (D Co), 28 Nov 1950 (DD)

CPL Norman B. Miller Jr., 29 Nov 1950 (KIA)

CPL Sylvian A. Moyers, 24 Apr 1951 (DOW)

SFC Henry C. Nunnery (D Co), 28 Nov 1950 (KIA)

PV2 Raymond R. O'Connor, 13 Jun 1953 (KIA)

CPL Thomas F. Palmer (D Co), 29 Nov 1950 (KIA)

PV2 Jerry B. Powers (D Co), 28 Nov 1950 (KIA)

CPL James A. Prater (C Co), 16 Mar 1951 (KIA)

PV2 Roy Ray Jr., 27 Apr 1953 (KIA)

SFC Oliver P. Riels (A Co), 2 Dec 1950 (DD)

PFC Donnie F. Roby (D Co), 28 Nov 1950 (KIA)

PV2 Robert F. Ruder, 13 Jun 1953 (KIA)

CPL William M. Scalf (HSC), 4 Nov 1951 (KIA)

1LT Carl J. Schiltz (C Co), 24 Nov 1950 (KIA)

CPL Glenn A. Schreiner (A Co), 1 Dec 1951 (KIA)

PV2 Ben T. Smith Jr. (D Co), 29 Nov 1950 (KIA)

CPL Charles L. Somers (B Co), 21 Nov 1950 (DD)

PFC Earnest A. Taylor (B Co), 21 Nov 1950 (MIA)

SFC Raymond R. Thornton (D Co), 28 Nov 1950 (DD)

MSG James M. Traylor, 18 Dec 1950 (MIA)

PV2 Charles C. Van Elsberg (B Co), 21 Nov 1950 (KIA)

CPL Nick Vezakis Jr. (B Co), 16 Oct 1951 (KIA)

2LT Thomas D. Wood, 15 Jun 1953 (KIA)

PV2 Steve A. Zagurskie (D Co), 23 Apr 1951 (KIA)

PFC Salvatore J. Zucca, 25 Jul 1953 (DOW)

Commanders  
LTC John P. Kuspa, 1985–1987

LTC Jerry Samples, 1987–1991

LTC Geoffrey Van Epps, 2015

LTC Jason M. Whitten, 2015–2017

LTC Scott F. Swilley, 2017–2019

LTC Sean A. Wittmeier, 2019–2021

LTC Alexander D. Samms, 2021- present

See also 

 Coats of arms of U.S. Engineer Battalions
 Military engineering of the United States
 Combat engineer
 Military engineering

References and notes

External links 

 10th Engineer Battalion

009